Marat Safin was the defending champion, but did not participate this year.

Rafael Nadal won the title, beating Guillermo Coria 5–7, 6–1, 6–2 in the final.

Seeds

Draw

Finals

Top half

Bottom half

References

 Main Draw
 Qualifying Draw

2005 ATP Tour
2005 China Open (tennis)